Lionel Bosco (born 18 September 1981) is a Belgian former professional basketball player and current head coach of Liège Basket of the BNXT League. He also represents the Belgian national basketball team.

Coaching career
After his playing career, Bosco became assistant coach of Liège Basket. In March 2020, he was appointed as new head coach after Sacha Massot left the team.

International career
He represented Belgium at the 2015 EuroBasket where the team was eliminated by Greece in eighth finals, losing 75–54.

References

1981 births
Living people
Belfius Mons-Hainaut players
Belgian men's basketball players
Belgian basketball coaches
Brussels Basketball players
Gent Hawks players
JL Bourg-en-Bresse players
Leuven Bears players
Liège Basket players
Liège Basket coaches
People from Huy
Point guards
Sportspeople from Liège Province
Belgian expatriate basketball people in France